Igor Bobkov (born January 2, 1991) is a Russian professional ice hockey goaltender. He currently plays for Avtomobilist Yekaterinburg in the Kontinental Hockey League (KHL). He was previously under a two-way contract with the Anaheim Ducks of the National Hockey League (NHL), however never featured with the Ducks. Before playing professional hockey, Bobkov spent time in the Ontario Hockey League with the London Knights and Kingston Frontenacs.  Bobkov represents Russia internationally, and helped them win a gold medal at the 2011 World Junior Ice Hockey Championships.

Playing career
Bobkov was selected by the Anaheim Ducks in the 3rd round (76th overall) of the 2009 NHL Entry Draft. After spending a year in Russia, including playing at the 2010 World Junior Ice Hockey Championships, Bobkov was selected 53rd overall in the 2010 CHL Import Draft by the London Knights. He managed three wins in 21 games playing behind Michael Houser. He was signed by the Ducks to a three-year entry level contract on October 7, 2010. During the 2011 OHL offseason, Bobkov was traded to the Kingston Frontenacs.

Bobkov made his professional debut with the Syracuse Crunch of the American Hockey League at the end of the 2010–11 season, after his season with the Knights was over.  He joined the Crunch again after the Frontenacs' season was over the following season.  Bobkov made the jump to professional hockey full-time with the Norfolk Admirals during the 2012–13 season.  During the 2013–14 season, Bobkov has split time between the Admirals in the AHL and the Utah Grizzlies of the ECHL.

On August 6, 2015, after not being tendered a contract offer to be retained by the Ducks, Bobkov's KHL rights were traded from Metallurg Magnitogorsk to Admiral Vladivostok. He was then signed as free agent to a two-year contract with the Russian club.

After three seasons with Admiral, Bobkov left Vladivostok as a free agent, securing a lucrative two-year contract with Avangard Omsk on May 16, 2018.

In the 2020–21 season, Bobkov backstopped in tandem with Šimon Hrubec, helping Avangard to their first KHL championship, posting an 18–7–2 regular season record and collecting 4 post-season wins to claim the Gagarin Cup.

As a free agent following the conclusion of his contract with Avangard, Bobkov signed a one-year contract with Ak Bars Kazan on 14 May 2021. In the following 2021–22 season, Bobkov made just 16 appearances with Ak Bars, collecting 7 wins.

Bobkov left Ak Bars at the conclusion of his contract and moved to Avtomobilist Yekaterinburg as a free agent, agreeing to a one-year contract on 6 May 2022.

International play

Bobkov was recognized as the "Best Goaltender" at the 2009 IIHF World U18 Championships, where he backstopped Team Russia to a win a Silver Medal.  He represented Russia again at the 2010 and 2011 World Junior Championships, helping the team to a gold medal in 2011.  During the 2011 tournament, Bobkov served as a backup to Dmitri Shikin for most of the tournament.  In the gold medal game against Canada, Bobkov came in to relieve Shikin and stopped 20 shots.  In addition to securing the gold medal, Bobkov was named Russia's top player in that game.

Career statistics

International

As of the end of the 2010–11 season.

Awards and honors

References

External links

1991 births
Living people
Admiral Vladivostok players
Ak Bars Kazan players
Anaheim Ducks draft picks
Avangard Omsk players
Avtomobilist Yekaterinburg players
Kingston Frontenacs players
London Knights players
Norfolk Admirals players
People from Surgut
Russian ice hockey goaltenders
Stalnye Lisy players
Syracuse Crunch players
Utah Grizzlies (ECHL) players